Nicolás Brian Acevedo Tabárez (born 14 April 1999) is a Uruguayan professional footballer who plays as a midfielder for Bahia, on loan from Major League Soccer club New York City FC.

Club career
A youth academy graduate of Liverpool Montevideo, Acevedo made his professional debut on 14 October 2018 in a 2–1 win against Defensor Sporting.

On 2 March 2020, MLS side New York City FC announced the signing of Acevedo on a permanent transfer using allocation money.

On 20 December 2022, it was announced that Acevedo would spend the entirety of 2023 on loan with Brazilian side Bahia.

International career
Acevedo is a former Uruguay youth international. He has represented Uruguay at 2019 South American U-20 Championship and 2019 FIFA U-20 World Cup.

Personal life
Nicolás is the younger brother of Rentistas forward Luis Acevedo.

Honours
New York City FC
 Campeones Cup: 2022
 MLS Cup: 2021

Career statistics

Club

References

1999 births
Living people
Uruguayan footballers
Uruguayan Primera División players
Liverpool F.C. (Montevideo) players
New York City FC players
Esporte Clube Bahia players
Association football midfielders
Major League Soccer players
Uruguay under-20 international footballers
Uruguayan expatriate footballers
Expatriate soccer players in the United States
Uruguayan expatriate sportspeople in the United States
Expatriate footballers in Brazil
Uruguayan expatriate sportspeople in Brazil